Geumjeong District is a district in north central Busan, South Korea. Approximately 7.3% of Busan's population is in Geumjeong-gu.
The Hoedong Reservoir is located on the district's eastern boundary, and the mountain Geumjeongsan on the west.  Because of this, 75% of the district's land is restricted from residential development.  The district's population is concentrated in the valley of the Oncheoncheon stream, a tributary of the Suyeonggang.

Notable landmarks include Beomeosa, a Buddhist temple dating to the Silla dynasty, and Geumjeongsan, the mountain which overlooks much of the district.  Geumjeongsan is topped by the walls of the Geumjeongsanseong, which were built in the Joseon Dynasty.

Several colleges and universities are located in Geumjeong-gu.  The most prominent of these is Pusan National University.

Geumjeong-gu serves as a nexus of transit connections between central Busan and the rest of Korea.  The northern end of Busan Subway Line 1 lies in Nopo-dong, where it adjoins Busan's major express bus terminal.  In addition, the southern terminus of the Gyeongbu Expressway lies within the district.

History
For most of its history, Geumjeong was officially part of Dongnae, which was itself an independent region until it was amalgamated into the city of Busan in 1942.  Geumjeong-gu was formed by separation from Dongnae in 1988.

Originally Geumjeong consisted of 20 administrative dong, but several changes have been made to leave the current total at 17:

 1992
 Bugok-4-dong was created from Bugok-1-dong
 1998
 Oryun-dong was absorbed by Bugok-3-dong
 Seon-dong and Dugu-dong were merged to form Seondugu-dong
 Nopo-dong and Cheongnyeong-dong were merged to form Cheongnyeongnopo-dong
 2009
 Seo-4-dong was absorbed by Seo-3-dong

Administrative divisions
Geumjeong-gu is divided into 13 legal dong, which altogether comprise 17 administrative dong, as follows:

Sister cities
 Changping, China
 Putuo, China

Notable people from Geumjeong District
 Park Ji-min known by his stage name Jimin, singer-songwriter, dancer, composer and member of one of the most successful boyband BTS is native of Geumjeong District
 Exy (Real Name: Chu So-jung, Hangul: 추소정), singer-songwriter, rapper, dancer, actress, MC and K-pop idol, leader and member of K-pop girlgroup Cosmic Girls is native of Geumjong District as well.

See also
Geography of South Korea
Subdivisions of South Korea

References

External links

Geumjeong-gu website (in English)

 
Districts of Busan